North Carolina is a state located in the Southern United States. According to the 2020 United States Census, North Carolina is the ninth most populous state with  inhabitants, but the 28th largest by land area spanning  of land. North Carolina is divided into 100 counties and contains 532 municipalities consisting of cities, towns, or villages. The three different terms have no legal distinction.

Largest municipalities

Below is a list of the 50 largest municipalities in North Carolina according to the 2020 census.

A

B

C

D

E

F

G

H

I

J

K

L

M

N

O

P

R

S

T

U

V

W

Y

Z
  Zebulon, North Carolina – town, Wake County, North Carolina
  Zionville, North Carolina – town, Watauga County, North Carolina

See also
 North Carolina
 List of counties in North Carolina
 List of unincorporated communities in North Carolina

References

North Carolina, List of cities in
Municipalities
North Carolina